XNN or xnn may refer to:

 XNN, the IATA code for Xining Caojiabao International Airport, Huzhu County, Qinghai, China
 xnn, the ISO 639-3 code for Northern Kankanaey language, Philippines